Bassem Morsy el-Qotb Abdallah (born 1 January 1992) is an Egyptian professional footballer who plays as a forward for National Bank of Egypt. And he owns a football academy called "Bassem Morsy Academy".

Club career

Petrojet
Morsy played with Petrojet for 4 years scoring 4 goals in 13 matches. Petrojet manager then, Mokhtar Mokhtar, ended his contract with Petrojet stating that Basem became more obsessed with his looks than playing football.

El Entag El Harby
Morsy signed with the military club El Entag El Harby in 2013 where he became the star of the club. Although he scored nine goals in the league, he did not succeed of avoiding relegation to the Egyptian Second Division at the end of the season.

Zamalek
On 2 July 2014, Morsy signed for Egyptian giants Zamalek from El Entag El Harby. On 25 October 2014, Morsy scored his first goal for Zamalek against Smouha in the Egyptian Premier League. Morsy scored his first hat-trick with Zamalek on 15 July 2015 against Al Nasr. He succeeded in winning the Egyptian Premier League with Zamalek on his first season. He finished the season as the club top goalscorer with 18 goals and second goalscorer in the league after the top goalscorer Hossam Salama. Morsy succeeded in winning Egypt Cup with Zamalek after he scored two goals against Zamalek rival Al Ahly in the final and he repeated it again and scored another two goals against Al Ahly and won the cup again for Zamalek in the next season.

Career statistics 
As of 13 March 2023

International career
Morsy has been called up for Egypt for the first time in 2015 for a friendly match against Jamaica. On 4 June 2014, Morsy made his debut against Jamaica as a substitute and managed to score his first international goal to make it 2–2. He celebrated his goal by pointing out to his shirt number 15, and drawing a heart in the air, dedicating the goal to his injured teammate Gedo, who missed the match due to a severe injury, used to celebrate the same way, and used to wear the same shirt.

International statistics
.

International goals
Egypt score listed first, score column indicates score after each Morsy goal.

Honours

Club
Zamalek
Egyptian Premier League: 2014–15
Egypt Cup: 2015, 2015–16, 2017–18
Egyptian Super Cup: 2016–17

Individual
Egypt Cup Top goalscorer: 2015–16

References

1992 births
Living people
People from Gharbia Governorate
People from Tanta
Association football forwards
Egyptian footballers
Egyptian expatriate footballers
Expatriate footballers in Greece
Egypt international footballers
Egyptian Premier League players
Super League Greece players
Petrojet SC players
El Entag El Harby SC players
Zamalek SC players
Athlitiki Enosi Larissa F.C. players
Smouha SC players